Shontelle Stowers (born 14 November 1986) is a New Zealand-born Australian rugby union and rugby league who plays for the St. George Illawarra in the NRL Women's Premiership and the North Sydney Bears in the NSWRL Women's Premiership.

Playing career
Stowers moved to Australia at the age of 21 and played rugby union for the Warringah Rats. While with the club she represented the Australian rugby sevens side and the Australia.

In 2017, she switched to rugby league and played for Cronulla-Caringbah. In 2018, she was selected for the NSW City side for the National Championships.

In February 2018, Stowers represented Samoa at the 2018 Rugby League Commonwealth Championship.

On 17 June 2018, Stowers signed for the Sydney Roosters as one of their 15 marquee signings.

In Round 1 of the 2018 NRL Women's Premiership, Stowers made her debut for the Sydney Roosters, starting at centre in their 10–4 loss to the New Zealand Warriors.

In May 2019, she represented NSW City at the 2019 Women's National Championships. On 8 June, she was named to make her debut for the New South Wales State of Origin team.

In 2020, Stowers joined the New Zealand Warriors, playing two games for the club that season.

References

External links
New Zealand Warriors profile

1986 births
Australia women's international rugby union players
Australian female rugby sevens players
Australian female rugby union players
Living people
New Zealand expatriates in Australia
New Zealand female rugby league players
Rugby league centres
Samoa women's national rugby league team players
Sydney Roosters (NRLW) players
New Zealand Warriors (NRLW) players